Ture Lennart Bodström (20 April 1928 – 30 April 2015) was a Swedish politician born in Gothenburg, who served as the Minister for Foreign Affairs in Olof Palme's Social Democratic cabinet from 1982 to 1985.

His refusal, without further evidence, to participate in the accusations against the Soviet Union regarding its possible submarine operations in Swedish waters led to a motion of confidence against him in the Riksdag, which failed. This is still  the only time such a motion has been raised against a single member of a Swedish government (although some have resigned facing the threat of one).

Following the 1985 election, Bodström was reassigned to the post of Minister for Education. Bodström's son Thomas Bodström is also a Social Democratic politician.

He died one week and three days after his 87th birthday.

References

20th-century Swedish politicians
1928 births
2015 deaths
Politicians from Gothenburg
Swedish Ministers for Education
Swedish Ministers for Foreign Affairs
Place of death missing
Swedish Social Democratic Party politicians
Swedish Ministers for Trade
Ambassadors of Sweden to Norway